Dominic Adams (born 17 March 1985) is a British actor and model, known for his role as Tony Bishara in the Lifetime comedy-drama Devious Maids and in Six.

Life and career
Adams was born in Bristol, England on March 17, 1985, to an Iranian father and British mother, and attended the Bristol Old Vic Theatre School and Goldsmiths, University of London. In England, he appeared in a number of stage productions, and in 2008 made his screen debut in a walk-on part in film Telstar: The Joe Meek Story.

In 2014, Adams was cast as series regular for second season of Lifetime comedy-drama Devious Maids as Tony Bishara, Rebecca Wisocky's character bodyguard. In July 2014, shortly after the second-season finale aired, it was announced that Bishara would not be returning to the series for the third season.

Filmography

Film

Television

References
http://deadline.com/2016/01/six-dominic-adams-lead-history-military-drama-series-1201690323/
https://www.tvinsider.com/130554/dominic-adams-interview-michael-six-history/
http://www.huffingtonpost.com/entry/master-class-the-talented-dominic-adams-shows-that_us_5881293fe4b0111ea60b9434

External links
 

British male television actors
British male models
1985 births
Living people
British people of Iranian descent